Mahidar or Mahi Dar may refer to:
 Mahidar, Baneh
 Mahidar-e Olya, Saqqez County
 Mahidar-e Sofla, Saqqez County